Kleomenis Kleomenous was a Hellenic Army officer.

Born in Athens in 1852, he fought in the Greco-Turkish War of 1897 and the Balkan Wars of 1912–13. He retired on 3 February 1914 (O.S.) with the rank of Major General.

References 

1852 births
20th-century deaths
Hellenic Army major generals
Greek military personnel of the Balkan Wars
Greek military personnel of the Greco-Turkish War (1897)
Military personnel from Athens